The 2018 New York Comptroller election was held on November 6, 2018, alongside other New York elections for Governor, State Senate, State Assembly, and Attorney General. Incumbent Democrat Thomas DiNapoli easily won a third term, defeating Republican nominee Jonathan Trichter and minor party candidates.

As of 2021, this is the last statewide election where Putnam, Montgomery, Madison, Niagara and Chautauqua counties voted Democratic. As of 2021, this, along with the concurrent senate election is the last time Ontario, Seneca, Cayuga, Oneida, Warren, Washington, Otsego, Saint Lawrence and Sullivan counties have voted Democratic in a statewide election.

Results

References

Comptroller
2018
New York